A partial lunar eclipse took place on Monday, December 10, 1973, the last of four lunar eclipses in 1973. At maximum eclipse, a small bite out of the Moon should have been visible. The eclipse lasted for 1 hour, 8 minutes and 29.4 seconds, with just 10.069% of the Moon in shadow at maximum. The Moon was only 0.9 days before perigee (Perigee on the same day at 22:22 UTC), making it 5.8% larger than average.

Visibility 
It was completely visible over North America, Central America, Caribbean, South America, the Atlantic Ocean, Europe, Africa, and central Asia, seen rising over the eastern Pacific Ocean and setting over the western Indian Ocean. As of Equator, it was seen rising over 118th meridian west and setting over the 62nd meridian east.

Related lunar eclipses

Eclipses in 1973 
 An annular solar eclipse on Thursday, 4 January 1973.
 A penumbral lunar eclipse on Thursday, 18 January 1973.
 A penumbral lunar eclipse on Friday, 15 June 1973.
 A total solar eclipse on Saturday, 30 June 1973.
 A penumbral lunar eclipse on Sunday, 15 July 1973.
 A partial lunar eclipse on Monday, 10 December 1973.
 An annular solar eclipse on Monday, 24 December 1973.

Lunar year series

Half-Saros cycle
A lunar eclipse will be preceded and followed by solar eclipses by 9 years and 5.5 days (a half saros). This lunar eclipse is related to two partial solar eclipses of Solar Saros 122.

See also 
List of lunar eclipses
List of 20th-century lunar eclipses

Notes

External links 
 

1973-12
1973 in science
December 1973 events